Ross Berry is a New Hampshire politician.

Early life
Berry earned a bachelor's degree.

Career
Berry served as executive director of the New Hampshire Republican State Committee from 2015 to 2017. In 2017, Berry started serving as the president of the company REVT Strategies, LLC, a position he still holds. On November 3, 2020, Berry was elected to the New Hampshire House of Representatives where he represents the Hillsborough 44 district. He assumed office on December 2, 2020.

Personal life
Berry resides in Manchester, New Hampshire. Berry is married to his wife Samantha (Sammi) Berry.

References

Living people
Politicians from Manchester, New Hampshire
Republican Party members of the New Hampshire House of Representatives
21st-century American politicians
Year of birth missing (living people)